Sarah Benck (born 28 March 1984) is a female musician from Omaha, Nebraska, and a visible figure in the Omaha Indie rock scene. She is a singer-songwriter and plays the guitar and harmonica. Together with The Robbers she has recorded two albums: Suicide Doublewide (2005) and Neighbor's Garden (2007).

Awards and accolades
She was awarded "Best contemporary singer" at the 2006 Omaha Entertainment and Arts Awards and "Best Adult Alternative" with the Robbers in 2007. That year they were also nominated for "Best blues", "Artist of the year", and "Local album of the year" (for Neighbor's Garden).

See also
Indie rock

References

External links
SarahBenck.com

Musicians from Omaha, Nebraska
1984 births
American indie rock musicians
Living people
21st-century American women singers